Jaramillo  is a village and municipality in the Languiñeo Department of Chubut Province in southern Argentina. It is located on the right bank of the Palena River just below Lake Vintter.

Notes and references

Populated places in Chubut Province